John of Nepomuk (or John Nepomucene) ( 1345 – 20 March 1393)
was the saint of Bohemia (Czech Republic) who was drowned in the Vltava river at the behest of Wenceslaus IV of Bohemia. Later accounts state that he was the confessor of the queen of Bohemia and refused to divulge the secrets of the confessional. On the basis of this account, John of Nepomuk is considered the first martyr of the Seal of the Confessional, a patron against calumnies and, because of the manner of his death, a protector from floods and drowning.

Basic biographical information
Jan z Pomuku came from the small market town of Pomuk (later renamed Nepomuk) in Bohemia, now in the Czech Republic, which belonged to the nearby Cistercian abbey.

Born in the 1340s, his father was a certain Velflín (Welflin, Wölflin) and his mother is unknown. His father's name is probably a derivative of the German name Wolfgang.

Jan first studied at the University of Prague, then furthered his studies in canon law at the University of Padua from 1383 to 1387. In 1393 he was made the vicar-general of Saint Giles Cathedral by Jan of Jenštejn (1348–1400), who was the Archbishop of Prague from 1378 to 1396. In the same year, on 20 March, he was tortured and thrown into the river Vltava from Charles Bridge in Prague by order of King Wenceslaus IV.

  At issue was the appointment of a new abbot for the rich and powerful Benedictine Abbey of Kladruby; its abbot was a territorial magnate whose resources would be crucial to Wenceslaus in his struggles with nobles. Wenceslaus at the same time was backing the Avignon papacy, whereas the Archbishop of Prague followed its rival, the pope at Rome. Contrary to the wishes of Wenceslaus, John confirmed the archbishop's candidate for Abbot of Kladruby, and was drowned on the king's orders on 20 March 1393.

This account is based on four contemporary documents. The first is the accusation of the king, presented to Pope Boniface IX on 23 April 1393, by Archbishop Jan of Jenštejn, who immediately went to Rome together with the new abbot of Kladruby.

A few years later Abbott Ladolf of Sagan listed John of Nepomuk in the catalog of Sagan abbots, completed in 1398, as well as in the treatise "De longævo schismate", lib. VII, c. xix.

A further document is the "Chronik des Deutschordens"/Chronik des Landes Preussen, a chronicle of the Teutonic Order compiled by John of Posilge, who died in 1405.

In the above accusation, Jan of Jenštejn already calls John of Nepomuk a "saint martyr". The biography of the bishop (written by his chaplain) describes John of Nepomuk as "gloriosum Christi martyrem miraculisque coruscum" (in English: "a glorious martyr of Christ and sparkling with miracles").

Thus, the vicar put to death for defending the laws and the autonomy of the Catholic Church became revered as a saint directly after his death.

Later accounts

Much additional biographical information comes from Bohemian annalists who wrote 60 or more years after the events they recount. Although they may have taken advantage of sources not available today, their contribution is considered legendary by many historians, particularly by the Protestant ones.
In his chronicle Chronica regum Romanorum, completed in 1459, Thomas Ebendorfer (d. 1464) states that King Wenceslaus had drowned the confessor (the priest who heard the confession) of his wife, indicated as Magister Jan, because he had stated that only the one who rules properly deserves the name of king and had refused to betray the seal of Confession. This is the first source to mention this refusal as a motivation of the condemnation of John of Nepomuk.
 In his Instructions for the King, completed in 1471, Paul Zidek provides further details. King Wenceslaus was afraid that his wife had a lover. As she was used to confessing to Magister Jan, King Wenceslaus ordered him to reveal the name of the lover, but to no avail. Therefore, the king ordered John to be drowned. Note that in these chronicles neither the date of the events nor the name of the queen is mentioned.
 In 1483 John of Krumlov, dean of St. Vitus cathedral, states that John died in 1383 (one decade earlier than the recognized date, perhaps due to a transcription error). As the first wife of Wenceslaus died in 1386, this change of date also causes uncertainty about the name of the queen.

The mistake of John of Krumlov crept into the Annales Bohemorum of Wenceslaus Hajek of Liboczan (Václav Hájek z Libočan), the "Bohemian Livy". He suggested that two Jan di Nepomuks may have existed and have both been killed by King Wenceslaus. The first one is the queen's confessor, who died in 1383; the other the vicar of the archbishop, who disagreed with the king on the election of the abbot of Kladruby and was drowned in 1393. As Hajek's annals enjoyed a wide success, they influenced all subsequent historians for two centuries, up to the Latin edition, critically annotated by the translator, which considerably reduced Hajek's credit as a reliable historian.

Further and less reliable details about John of Nepomuk come from the annalists of the 17th and 18th centuries. Boleslaus Balbinus, S.J., in his Vita b. Joannis Nepomuceni martyris gives the most rich account.

Although the theory of Hajek of Liboczan has no credit today, some historians believe the vicar's refusal to betray the seal of the confessional might have been the secret reason why Wenceslaus took vengeance on John of Nepomuk as soon as a credible excuse provided the opportunity.

A controversial figure

Catholics see John of Nepomuk as a martyr to the cause of defending the Seal of the Confessional. Romantic nationalists regard him as a Czech martyr to imperial interference. Most historians present him as a victim of a late version of the inveterate investiture controversy between secular rulers and the Catholic hierarchy.

The connection of John of Nepomuk with the inviolability of the confessional is part of the transformation of an historical figure into a legend, which can be traced through successive stages. The archbishop, who hastened to Rome soon after the crime, in his charge against Wenceslaus, called the victim a martyr; in the vita written a few years later miracles are already recorded, by which the drowned man was discovered. About the middle of the 15th century the statement appears for the first time that the refusal to violate the seal of confession was the cause of John's death. Two decades later (1471), the dean of Prague, Paul Zidek, makes John the queen's confessor. The chronicler Wenceslaus Hajek speaks in 1541 (perhaps due to an incorrect reading of his sources) of two Johns of Nepomuk being drowned; the first as confessor, the second for his confirmation of the abbot.

The legend is especially indebted for its growth to the Jesuit historiographer Boleslaus Balbinus the "Bohemian Pliny", whose Vita beati Joannis Nepomuceni martyris was published in Prague, 1670. Although the Prague metropolitan chapter did not accept the biography dedicated to it, "as being frequently destitute of historical foundation and erroneous, a bungling work of mythological rhetoric", Balbinus stuck to it. In 1683 the Charles Bridge was adorned with a statue of the saint, which has had numerous successors; in 1708 the first church was dedicated to him at Hradec Králové; a more famous Pilgrimage Church of Saint John of Nepomuk was founded in 1719.

Meanwhile, in spite of the objection of the Jesuits, the process was inaugurated which ended with his canonisation. On 31 May 1721, he was beatified, and on 19 March 1729, he was canonised under Pope Benedict XIII. The acts of the process, comprising 500 pages, distinguish two Johns of Nepomuk and sanction the cult of the one who was drowned in 1383 as a martyr of the sacrament of penance.

According to some Protestant sources, the figure of John Nepomuk is a legend due to Jesuits and that its historical kernel is really Jan Hus, who was metamorphosed from a Bohemian Reformer into a Roman Catholic saint: the Nepomuk story would be based on Wenceslaus Hajek's blending of the Jan who was drowned in 1393 and the Jan who was burned in 1415. The resemblances are certainly striking, extending to the manner of celebrating their commemorations. But when the Jesuits came to Prague, the Nepomuk veneration had long been widespread; and the idea of canonization originated in opposition not to the Hussites, but to Protestantism, as a weapon of the Counter-Reformation. In the image of the saint which gradually arose is reflected the religious history of Bohemia.

A coincidental drought in the region a year later helped the legend along; the church convinced the peasants that the drought represented God's punishment for the killing of Jan Nepomucký.  Building on that success, they attempted to paint the king as even blacker, with certain clerical circles spreading reports of John's courage, saying that as confessor to the Queen he had refused to reveal her secrets, and that was why he had been murdered.  Belief in John's supernatural powers culminated with the discovery of his supposed tongue when three centuries later his tomb was opened and a piece of reddened tissue fell out of his skull.

Regional significance

Statues of Saint John of Nepomuk are often encountered in Central Europe, including the Czech Republic, Slovakia, Hungary, Austria, Croatia, Slovenia, Germany, Italy, Poland, Lithuania, Romania (Sibiu), Alsace-Lorraine and, although rarely, Ukraine. He is usually portrayed with a halo with five stars, reminding to the stars that hovered over the Vltava River on the night of his murder. His tomb, a Baroque monument cast in silver and silver-gilt that was designed by Josef Emanuel Fischer of Erlach, stands in St Vitus Cathedral, Prague.

Statue usage 
A statue of Saint John of Nepomuk has often been erected on bridges in many countries, such as on the Ponte Milvio in Rome. The one in Prague was extremely popular as late as the 19th Century, when people traveled from Tyrol, Hungary, and particularly Bohemia to Prague to celebrate his feast day, May 16. There is a white statue of St. John of Nepomuk in the small village of Divina, in Slovakia. There is also a commemorative plaque on a bridge leading out of Obergurgl, Austria depicting Nepomuk holding a finger to his lips, as if protecting a secret.

There is a statue of St. John of Nepomuk in Riedstadt, a small town near Frankfurt am Main, Germany. The statue was first put at the riverside in Gernsheim where it stayed from 1933-1998. In May 1999, it was moved 10 kilometers North and placed at its new location by then newly built bridge.

Music
 Johannes Nepomuk Messe in G major (in German) by

See also 

List of Catholic saints
Pilgrimage Church of Saint John of Nepomuk
Statue of John of Nepomuk, Vyšehrad

Notes

External links 

 The "official" page of John of Nepomuk
  Catholic Encyclopedia (1910): "St. John Nepomucene" This provides a Catholic point of view
 Christian Classics Ethereal Library at Calvin College: "John of Nepomuk" This provides a Protestant point of view. It was also the source of the initial version of this article.
 
 Zdarns.cz
 St. John Nepomuk, Martyr at the Christian Iconography web site

1340 births
1393 deaths
Czech Roman Catholic saints
Charles University alumni
14th-century Christian saints
Burials at St. Vitus Cathedral
14th-century Roman Catholic martyrs
People executed by drowning
Priest–penitent privilege
Canonizations by Pope Benedict XIII
Beatifications by Pope Innocent XIII
People from Plzeň-South District